Weird Tales of the Ramones is a box set compilation by American punk band the Ramones. It was released on August 16, 2005. There are 85 songs on 3 CDs, plus a DVD containing the feature "Lifestyles of the Ramones", a documentary featuring several of their music videos up to 1990 interspaced by interview clips with the band and figures in pop culture, plus the music videos released by the band (including an MTV-banned version of "Substitute") after the release of the main feature on the DVD. The set was compiled by Johnny Ramone and released by Rhino Records.

The boxset also contains a special oversize comic book, focusing on the legend of the band, written and illustrated by multiple contributors, a 3D pair of glasses and a postcard to dedicate to Joey, Johnny and Dee Dee.

The cover art is a likely parody of the 1920s and 1930s horror magazine Weird Tales, where the title of the album likely gets its name from.

CD track listing

Disc 1

Disc 2

Disc 3

DVD track listing
 "Do You Remember Rock 'n' Roll Radio?"
 "Rock 'n' Roll High School"
 "We Want the Airwaves"
 "Psycho Therapy"
 "Time Has Come Today"
 "Howling at the Moon (Sha-La-La)"
 "Something to Believe In"
 "I Wanna Live"
 "I Wanna Be Sedated"
 "Pet Sematary"
 "Merry Christmas (I Don't Want to Fight Tonight)"
 "I Believe in Miracles"
 "Strength to Endure"
 "Poison Heart"
 "Substitute" (MTV banned version)
 "I Don't Want to Grow Up"
 "Spider-Man"
 "Blitzkrieg Bop" (Live)

Personnel
 Joey Ramone - lead vocals
 Johnny Ramone - guitar
 Dee Dee Ramone - bass guitar, backing and lead vocals 
 Marky Ramone - drums
 C. J. Ramone - bass guitar, backing vocals (disc 3: tracks 9 - 25)
 Tommy Ramone - drums (disc 1: tracks 1 - 25)
 Richie Ramone - drums (disc 2: tracks 14 - 26, disc 3: tracks 1 - 8)

References 

2005 compilation albums
2005 video albums
Music video compilation albums
Rhino Records compilation albums
Rhino Records video albums
Ramones video albums
Ramones compilation albums